HSQ may refer to:
 Hampton String Quartet
 Hollywood String Quartet
 Hydrogen silsesquioxane